Persatuan Sepak Bola Poso, commonly known as Persipos Poso, or Persipos, is an  Indonesian football club based in Poso Regency, Central Sulawesi. Club played in Liga 3.

In September 2014, Persipos junior team won football branch at the 7th Games of Central Sulawesi Province, after beating Persipal Palu junior team in the final with a score of 4-1.

References

External links
Liga-Indonesia.co.id
Liga Indonesia Second Division 2008/2009

Football clubs in Indonesia
Football clubs in Central Sulawesi